Cataract, anterior polar 2 is a protein that in humans is encoded by the CTAA2 gene.

References

Further reading